Tillandsia demissa is a species of plant in the family Bromeliaceae. It is endemic to Ecuador.  Its natural habitat is subtropical or tropical dry shrubland. It is threatened by habitat loss.

References

demissa
Endemic flora of Ecuador
Endangered plants
Taxonomy articles created by Polbot